Quadriga is a Latin word for  a chariot drawn by four horses.

It may also refer to:
 the Triumphal Quadriga, also known as the Horses of Saint Mark
 the sculptural depiction of a four-horse chariot atop the Brandenburg Gate
 Quadriga (award), the statuette for which is modeled after the Brandenburg quadriga
 Quadriga Consort, an early music ensemble based in Austria
 Quadriga Productions, a film production company
 European quadriga, the quadrinomial committee led by the European Commission (Eurogroup) with the European Central Bank, the International Monetary Fund and the European Stability Mechanism that organised loans to the governments of Greece
 Quadriga, a method of interpretation of the Bible that developed in the early church and survived up to medieval times. It stated that a text had four layers of meaning: the literal, the moral, the allegorical and the anagogical. See Allegorical interpretation of the Bible.
 Quadriga Fintech Solutions, a former Canadian cryptocurrency exchange